Christopher Blake Bucknor (born August 23, 1962) is a Jamaican umpire in Major League Baseball (MLB) who worked in the National League (NL) from 1996 to 1999 and has worked in both major leagues since 2000.

Umpiring career

Bucknor was a member of the umpiring crew for the 2005 and 2021 All-Star Games, and also for the 2007, 2008, 2009, 2013 and 2020 American League Division Series.

In 2003 and in 2006, Sports Illustrated surveys of active major league players voted Bucknor as the worst umpire in MLB. In a 2010 ESPN survey of 100 active players, Bucknor was again named the worst umpire in MLB.

Bucknor was the first base umpire for Detroit Tigers pitcher Justin Verlander's second no-hitter, thrown on May 7, against the Toronto Blue Jays.

Bucknor was the home plate umpire for Chicago White Sox pitcher Lucas Giolito’s no-hitter, thrown on August 25, 2020, against the Pittsburgh Pirates.

Injuries
On May 1, 2012, Bucknor suffered an undisclosed injury during a game between the Pittsburgh Pirates and St. Louis Cardinals and was forced to leave the contest. He was listed as "day-to-day" following the injury and was replaced by minor league call-up umpire D.J. Reyburn the following day.

On July 12, 2013, Bucknor was injured and left an Oakland A's/Boston Red Sox game when he was hit in the facemask by a 92-mile per hour pitch thrown by Jarrod Parker after it grazed Daniel Nava.

Personal life
Bucknor moved to the United States in 1973. He attended State University of New York at Cortland, where he played center field, and received a B.S. in Recreation Therapy in 1984.

Bucknor resides in Brooklyn, New York. He works with the Bonnie Youth Club in Brooklyn and was inducted into the Bonnies Hall of Fame in 2000 as well as the Cortland Athletic Hall of Fame in October 2002. Bucknor is actively involved in teaching baseball to children in Jamaica. He also collects toys and helps to organize an annual "Treat Day"—a holiday party, featuring athletic events, video games, and picnics—for over 300 children in Jamaica. In 2008, he was inducted into the Brooklyn Parade Ground Baseball League Hall of Fame.

See also
 List of Major League Baseball umpires

References

External links
Retrosheet

1962 births
Living people
People from Westmoreland Parish
Major League Baseball umpires
Sportspeople from Brooklyn
Jamaican emigrants to the United States
Cortland Red Dragons baseball players